Chris Moyles (born 1974) is an English radio and television presenter.

Moyles may also refer to:

People
 Anthony Moyles (born 1976), an Irish Gaelic football coach and former player
 Jack Moyles (1913-1973), an American radio actor
 Michael Moyles, an Irish Gaelic football trainer and former player
 Padraic Moyles, a lead dancer in the show Riverdance

Other uses
 Moyles Court, a manor house at Rockford, Hampshire and now Moyles Court School

See also
Moyle (disambiguation)
Moyle (surname)